Sabaash Mapillai is a 1961 Indian Tamil-language comedy film directed and produced by S. Raghavan. The film stars M. G. Ramachandran, M. R. Radha and Malini. Relative to other Ramachandran films, this one had a mediocre run for 70 days in theatres.

Plot

Cast 
 M. G. Ramachandran
 M. R. Radha
 Malini
 V. R. Rajagopal
 T. K. Ramachandran
 K. Chandrakantha
 P. G. Lakshmirajam
 Wahab Kashmiri
 'Vairam' Krishnamoorthy
 C. P. Kittan
 V. P. S. Mani
 K. Sairam
 M. Lakshmi Prabha

Soundtrack 
The music was composed by K. V. Mahadevan. All lyrics were by A. Maruthakasi.

Reception 
Kanthan of Kalki negatively reviewed the film, but appreciated Ramachandran for displaying his skill at a rare comical role.

References

External links 
 

1960s Tamil-language films
1961 comedy films
1961 films
Films scored by K. V. Mahadevan
Indian comedy films